Iwal (also called Kaiwa from Jabêm Kai Iwac "Iwac highlanders") is an Austronesian language spoken by about 1,900 people from nine villages in Morobe Province, Papua New Guinea (Cobb & Wroge 1990). Although it appears most closely related to the South Huon Gulf languages, it is the most conservative member of its subgroup.

Name
The term Iwal is an endonym. Cognates in other related languages include Yabem Iwac and Numbami Yuwala.

Phonology
Iwal distinguishes 5 vowels and 16 consonants. Unlike most of its neighboring languages, it distinguishes the lateral /l/ from the trill /r/, the latter derived from earlier *s, as in aru from Proto-Oceanic (POc) *qasu 'smoke', ruru- from POc *susu 'breast', and ur from POc * 'rain'. Otherwise it appears to be the most phonologically conservative language in the South Huon Gulf chain (see Ross 1988:154–160). It has retained POc *t as /t/ (not /l/ or /y/) and POc *mw as /mw/ (not /my/ or /ny/), as in mwat 'snake' from POc *mwata.

Vowels (orthographic)

Consonants (orthographic)

Morphology

Pronouns and person markers

Free pronouns

Genitive pronouns

Possessive suffixes

Deictics
Iwal deictics correlate with first, second, and third person, each of which has a long and a short form. The latter appear to be anaphoric in usage. Deictics also serve to bracket relative clauses: ete/ebe ... ok/nok/nik. By far the most common brackets are ebe ... ok, but if the information in the clause is associated with either speaker or addressee, the brackets are likely to be ete ... nik or ete ... nok. Deictics may occur either in place of nouns or postposed to nouns, as in  'that earth/soil'.
  'near speaker'
  'near addressee'
  'away from speaker or addressee'

Numerals
Traditional Iwal counting practices started with the digits of the left hand, then continued on the right hand, and then the feet to reach '20', which translates as 'one person'. Higher numbers are multiples of 'one person'. Nowadays, most counting above '5' is done in Tok Pisin; in the Iwal New Testament, all numbers above '5'—except bage isgabu '10'—are written with Arabic numerals and most likely read in Tok Pisin.

Bioclassifying prefixes
One unusual feature of Iwal is a small set of bioclassifying prefixes: ei- (POc *kayu) for trees, wer- for edible greens,  (POc *manuk) for birds, ih- (POc *ikan) for fish.
  'canoe, canoe tree'
  'mango tree' (POc *waiwai)
  'two-leaf (Tok Pisin tulip), Gnetum gnemon, a tree with paired edible leaves'
  'cabbage'
  'pigeon' (POc *bune)
  'cassowary' (POc *kasuari)
  'Spanish mackerel' (Tok Pisin tangir)

Syntax

Word order
The basic word order in Iwal is SVO, with (mostly) prepositions, preposed genitives, postposed adjectives and relative clauses. Relative clauses are marked at both ends, and so are some prepositional phrases. Negatives come at the ends of the clauses they negate. There is also a class of deverbal resultatives that follow the main verb (and its object, if any).

'He'll chop down the canoe tree.'

'The roots did not go deep into the ground.'

'They'll see the things I have done.'

Verb serialization
Verb serialization is very common in Iwal. Within a serial verb construction, all verbs must agree in tense and the perfective marker is itself a serialized verb. Negatives come at the ends of the clauses they negate.

'He'll chop it down and it'll go and lie there.'

'Then he won't sit on the ground.'

'It rolled on down until it stopped.'

Note
The primary source for this article is Bradshaw (2001), whose copyright holder is Joel Bradshaw, whose contributions here are licensed under the GFDL.

References

 Anon. (2004). Organised Phonology Data: Iwal (Kaiwa) language. Summer Institute of Linguistics. 
 Bradshaw, Joel (2001). "Iwal grammar essentials, with comparative notes." In Andrew Pawley, Malcolm Ross, Darrell Tryon, eds., The boy from Bundaberg: Studies in Melanesian linguistics in honour of Tom Dutton, 51–74. Canberra: Pacific Linguistics.
 Cobb, Elyse, and Diane Wroge (1990). "Iwal transfer primer and teachers' training course." Read 25(2):40–44. Summer Institute of Linguistics.
 Ross, Malcolm (1988). Proto Oceanic and the Austronesian languages of western Melanesia. Canberra: Pacific Linguistics.

South Huon Gulf languages
Languages of Morobe Province